Daniel Lewis Cox (born August 9, 1974) is an American far-right politician. He is a Republican who represented the fourth district in the Maryland House of Delegates from 2019 to 2023. He was also the secretary of the Frederick County Republican Central Committee from 2018 to 2021, and served as a Frederick County co-chair for the state's Trump Victory Leadership County team. He was the unsuccessful Republican nominee in the 2022 Maryland gubernatorial election, which he lost in a landslide, and had been endorsed by former president Donald Trump. An election denier, Cox is a staunch proponent of the disproven conspiracy theory that the 2020 United States presidential election was marred by fraud.

Early life
Cox was born in Washington D.C. on August 9, 1974, as one of ten children. His father, Gary, named him after the biblical prophet Daniel. Cox initially lived in Takoma Park, Maryland, but his family moved north to Frederick County after his father, a minister, took a job there. He grew up on a farm near Taneytown, Maryland.

Education and career
Cox enrolled at the Wellspring Christian Family Schools, a faith-based home-school organization which was founded by his father, as a child. He attended Mount St. Mary's University from 1992 to 1995 and later attended the University of Maryland Global Campus, where in 2002 he earned a bachelor's degree in government and politics. He attended Regent University School of Law where in 2006 he earned a J.D. degree with distinction. He has been a member of the Maryland State Bar Association since 2006 and was a sole practitioner outside of Emmitsburg, Maryland. Cox is also a member of the Alliance Defending Freedom, which has been described as an anti-LGBTQ organization and was designated a hate group in February 2017 by the Southern Poverty Law Center.

Before getting involved with Maryland politics, Cox was a high school teacher from 1995 to 2005 at Walkersville Christian Family Schools. He also served as a Captain in the Civil Air Patrol.

Political involvement
Cox says he has been active in politics since 1980, when he campaigned with his parents for Ronald Reagan. He also worked on the 1996 presidential campaign of Alan Keyes and as an aide to former U.S. Representative Roscoe Bartlett. He was the Republican nominee for Dorchester County Circuit Court Clerk in 2006, losing the race to Democratic nominee Michael L. Baker. Cox ran on a platform that included establishing a division to help fathers gain visitation, ensuring mothers received child support, and refusing to issue licenses for same-sex marriages, which were not legal in Maryland at the time. From 2007 to 2009, he was the President of the Town Commission of Secretary, Maryland. He was the Republican nominee for Maryland's 8th congressional district in 2016, losing the race to Democratic nominee and state senator Jamie Raskin.

2016 House of Representatives election campaign

On February 1, 2016, Cox filed to run in 2016 in Maryland's 8th congressional district.

Cox was described as being the most conservative candidate in the Republican primary race. He campaigned on imposing a 10 percent flat tax for incomes over $36,000 and eliminating payroll taxes, strengthening gun ownership rights, abolishing the Internal Revenue Service, and reducing funding and programs for the departments of Commerce, Education, Energy, and Housing and Urban Development. He supported Ted Cruz in the 2016 Republican Party presidential primaries. Cox won the Republican primary with 44.4 percent of the vote. Cox pledged to join the Freedom Caucus, a group of tea party supporters, if elected.

In the general election, Democratic Party nominee Jamie Raskin defeated Cox (61%-34%).

In the legislature

Cox was sworn into the Maryland House of Delegates on January 9, 2019. He was a member of the Judiciary Committee, serving on its family law and public safety subcommittees from 2019 to 2020 and its family and juvenile law and civil law and procedure subcommittees from 2021 to 2023. In his first term, Cox filed 84 bills, only two of which passed (both of which were introduced in 2019), and attached amendments to others.

Involvement in the January 6 United States Capitol attack
In November 2020, Cox said that he was part of a Republican legal team observing the count of mail-in ballots in Philadelphia during the 2020 United States presidential election. After Donald Trump lost the 2020 presidential election, Cox has repeatedly endorsed Trump's false claims of a "stolen" election and called for a "forensic audit" of the 2020 election results, later calling for an audit of the 2020 elections in Maryland.

Cox helped arrange for buses to take constituents to the "Save America March" in Washington, D.C., on January 6, 2021; the rally preceded the violent attack on the U.S. Capitol, in which a mob of Trump supporters disrupted Congress's counting of the electoral votes in a failed attempt to keep Trump in power. During the rally, Cox sent a tweet attacking Vice President Mike Pence, writing "Pence is a traitor." After receiving backlash, Cox tweeted and retweeted false claims blaming antifa for the attack on the Capitol, and expressed his support for Enrique Tarrio, the leader of the Proud Boys, an extremist group with nationalist, neofascist and self-proclaimed Western-chauvinist views. Cox later said in June 2022 that his Twitter post was "his way of expressing his disappointment and not a personal attack on the vice president." After his win in the Republican gubernatorial primary, Cox has denied organizing buses for the rally.

The Frederick County Democratic Central Committee began a letter-writing campaign calling for Cox to be expelled from the House of Delegates for his false claims. Two days later Cox issued a statement denouncing "all mob violence including those who broke into the U.S. Capitol." In the statement Cox said he had attended the rally, but was not involved in the storming of the Capitol. He did not retract his statement about Pence. Governor Larry Hogan and Steven Clark, the chairman of the Frederick County Republican Central Committee, denounced Cox's comments, and delegate Kathleen Dumais, the co-chair of the House Joint Committee on Legislative Ethics, said that the committee received some inquiries about Cox's tweets.

In February 2022, representatives from Our Revolution and other progressive groups urged the Maryland State Board of Elections to consider blocking Cox from the ballot for his participation in the insurrection, citing Section 3 of the 14th Amendment to the United States Constitution. In May 2022, a lawsuit was filed against Maryland Elections Administrator Linda Lamone, seeking to remove Cox from the 2022 Republican primary ballot for his presence during the Capitol attack. Anne Arundel County circuit court judge Mark W. Crooks dismissed the case on May 20, 2022.

2022 Maryland gubernatorial campaign

In late June 2021, Cox filed paperwork to run for governor in 2022, and formally announced his candidacy on July 4, 2021. He launched his campaign with a campaign rally in Cambridge on August 6, 2021. He picked Gordana Schifanelli, an Eastern Shore lawyer, as his running mate. On November 22, 2021, Cox received the endorsement of former president Donald Trump.

Ahead of the primary election, Cox threatened lawsuits seeking to invalidate mail-in ballots. Some political observers said before the primary that Cox would have publicly doubted the results if he had lost to Kelly Schulz.

As polls showed Cox and Schulz running neck-and-neck in polls, the Democratic Governors Association spent $1 million for a television advertisement promoting Cox, hoping he would win the nomination and be easier for Democrats to defeat in November. Cox denied receiving any support from the DGA, saying that he had "nothing to do with the ad purchase". Some observers, including strategist Jim Dornan, say that two factors — Trump's endorsement and the DGA ad blitz — allowed Cox to advance to the general election. Other observers, including former Maryland lieutenant governor and Republican National Committee chair Michael Steele, say the ads had little impact on voters, highlighting that far-right politician and neo-Confederate activist Michael Peroutka had won the Attorney General primary on the same ballot by an almost identical margin to Cox, even though the DGA did not run any ads on his behalf.

Cox won the Republican primary on July 19, 2022, defeating Schulz with 52.0 percent of the vote. If elected, he would have been the first governor from Frederick County since Enoch Louis Lowe. At his victory party, Cox took photos with and accepted a gift from a young man who introduced himself as a member of the Maryland Proud Boys. The footage of this encounter, which was uploaded to Cox's Vimeo account, was deleted after The Washington Post contacted the Cox campaign, which responded with a statement denying an association with the young man.

Following his primary win, Cox sought to distance himself from the January 6 insurrection and former president Donald Trump, removing references to his endorsement from his website and making adjustments to his biography and issues pages. He also deactivated his account on Gab, a website that has been described as a social media haven for white supremacists and neo-Nazis and was used by the perpetrator of the Pittsburgh synagogue shooting, on which he had more than 1,000 posts.

Cox was defeated by Democratic nominee Wes Moore in the general election on November 8, 2022. He initially declined to concede after the election was called for Moore by various national news outlets, believing that there was still a path to victory, but called Moore the next day to concede the election.

Following Cox's defeat, his running mate Gordana Schifanelli filed to run for Chair of the Maryland Republican Party, seeking to succeed retiring chairman Dirk Haire, but was blocked from running because she filed an hour after the candidacy deadline. Schifanelli later said that Cox blamed her for their loss and that the running mates rarely spoke to each other during the campaign, with their relationship souring well before the general election. Cox disputed this claim, telling The Washington Post, "I never blamed Ms. Schifanelli for our election loss. Her comments are false and sadly self-serving." Cox later endorsed Nicole Beus Harris, a political consultant and the wife of U.S. Representative Andy Harris, as the next chair of the Maryland Republican Party.

Mail-in ballots lawsuit
On August 19, 2022, Cox said he opposed a lawsuit filed by the Maryland State Board of Elections to allow officials to count mail-in ballots ahead of Election Day, calling it "unconstitutional". According to the National Conference of State Legislatures, Maryland is the only state that restricts the processing of absentee ballots until after Election Day.

On September 15, he filed a court response opposing the early mail-in ballot counting, arguing that the state Board of Elections didn't have an "actual emergency" and the action would affect his candidacy. In a court hearing on September 20, Cox and his legal team argued that the court did not have the power to make policy, saying the authority to change election law belonged only to the legislature. On September 23, Montgomery County Circuit Court Judge James Bonifant ruled in favor of the Maryland State Board of Elections, allowing it to begin counting mail-in ballots on October 1.

On September 27, Cox appealed the ruling to the Maryland Court of Special Appeals, seeking an emergency order to block the early counting of Maryland's mail-in ballots. The court ruled against Cox's request to halt mail-in voting on September 29. On September 30, the case was moved to the Maryland Court of Appeals, who ruled on October 7, 2022, that the Maryland State Board of Elections could tabulate mail ballots ahead of Election Day, upholding the lower court ruling. In a news conference held after the court heard arguments, Cox said he would respect the court's decision: "I certainly will respect the court's decision. And in terms of the election, we're going to make sure that we uphold the process of the Constitution and law."

In January 2023, Cox appealed the Maryland Supreme Court's ruling to the U.S. Supreme Court. The Supreme Court declined to hear Cox's challenge on February 21, letting the ruling stand without comment.

Cox did not commit to accepting the results of the election with mail-in ballots being counted early. During a debate on October 12, Cox was non-committal when asked if he would accept the results of the election: "I have always accepted the election results that are fair and that are following the Constitution. At this point, it would be similar to saying that before a surgery takes place to decide whether or not the surgery went well". Ahead of the election, Cox called on his supporters to "monitor" the state's election drop boxes, alleging without evidence that the drop boxes were "regularly misused and stuffed with nefarious ballots".

Post-legislative career
After being defeated in the 2022 Maryland gubernatorial election, Cox returned to private practice in Frederick County, Maryland. In February 2023, Pennsylvania state senator Doug Mastriano hired Cox as his chief of staff. Cox also started a podcast titled It's Your Freedom!, with the first episode premiering on Facebook on February 7.

Also in February 2023, Wicomico County executive Julie Giordano nominated Cox to serve as special counsel for the county. If confirmed, he would have replaced Kevin Karpinksi, who had been recently terminated as special counsel for "ethics issues". Cox was scheduled to join the county council meeting to discuss any questions and concerns councilmembers had about his nomination, but was not present during the session. The Wicomico County Council voted 6–1 to reject Cox's nomination.

Political views and statements

Abortion
Cox identifies as "pro-life". In 2019, NARAL Pro-Choice Maryland, which supports abortion, gave Cox a 73% score. Maryland Right to Life, which opposes abortion, gave Cox a 92% score during his first term in the Maryland House of Delegates.

In February 2021, Cox joined delegates Kathy Szeliga and Sid Saab at a protest against abortion at the Maryland State House. During his first term in the legislature, Cox introduced fourteen bills that would restrict abortion access and offered budget amendments to remove state funding for the procedure. He also cosponsored several bills that would prohibit abortions if a fetal heartbeat is detected, including the Maryland Fetal Heartbeat Protection Act (HB 1195).

In June 2022, Cox praised the Supreme Court's ruling in Dobbs v. Jackson Women's Health Organization, which overturned Roe v. Wade and Planned Parenthood v. Casey. During his gubernatorial campaign, Cox said that he would end taxpayer funding through Medicaid for abortions and opposed using taxpayer funding to provide contraception options for college students or to women traveling from other states to obtain abortion services in Maryland. Cox declined to say whether he would support federal restrictions on abortions, including a bill introduced by Senator Lindsey Graham that would ban abortions after 15 weeks of pregnancy. During a debate on October 12, 2022, Cox said that he supported exceptions for rape, incest, or for the life of the mother.

Climate change and the environment
Cox rejects the scientific consensus on climate change. Cox voted against the Climate Solutions Now Act of 2021 (SB 414), a proposed climate bill that would have included a goal to reduce greenhouse gas emissions to a level that is 50 percent lower than it was in 2006 by 2030. He voted against the bill when it was re-introduced in the 2022 legislative session.

In September 2022, Cox said he would support repealing the state's ban on fracking.

In October 2022, Cox told Lancaster Farming that he supported efforts to clean up the Chesapeake Bay. Cox said he considered reducing effluent from bay area sewage systems and ending silt pouring from the Conowingo Dam to be a "top priority".

COVID-19 pandemic
In April 2020, Cox posted a portion of the state constitution on his Facebook page after Maryland governor Larry Hogan issued an executive order implementing a stay-at-home directive. He later challenged the legality of Hogan's statewide mask mandate. U.S. District Court Judge Catherine Blake struck down his lawsuit on May 20, 2020, saying that the state and country are "now in the grip of a public health crisis more severe than any seen for a hundred years." He withdrew his request for a temporary restraining order on July 20, 2020. Blake again rejected another lawsuit against COVID-19 restrictions filed by Cox in November 2020. In December 2020, Montgomery County Circuit Court Judge James Bonifant rejected a request made by local restaurants represented by Cox and attorney Ed Hartman to reverse an executive order issued by County Executive Marc Elrich that prohibited indoor dining at restaurants.

In May 2020, Cox attended a rally in Annapolis which protested Hogan's stay-at-home orders alongside delegates Warren E. Miller and Brian Chisholm, former delegate Deb Rey, 7th congressional district special election candidate Liz Matory, 2nd congressional district candidate Tim Fazenbaker, #WalkAway founder Brandon Straka, and 2022 gubernatorial candidate and perennial candidate Robin Ficker. Later in the month, Cox posted a tweet promoting a conspiracy theory linking the Bill and Melinda Gates Foundation to the coronavirus pandemic.

In October 2020, Cox provided legal representation for a Harford County man who was arrested for not wearing a mask at a polling place, arguing that the pair were only ordered to wear masks once they were inside the facility and election staff learned that they were Republicans. The family's request for a temporary restraining order to allow them to vote without wearing masks was rejected by Harford County Circuit Judge Angela M. Eaves.

In January 2021, Cox cosponsored the Consent of the Governed Act, which would remove the governor's ability to unilaterally declare a state of emergency and would require the governor to form a special session to extend any state of emergency declaration for longer than fourteen days, which would require two-thirds approval from both chambers of the Maryland General Assembly. In February 2021, Cox proposed a resolution that would immediately end Hogan's coronavirus emergency declaration. In March 2021, he introduced a bill that would ban any requirement to show proof of "a medical examination, a vaccination, a medical test, or any other medical information" for employment or travel, and would allow parents to object to a child's vaccination as a requirement to be admitted to a public school.

In June 2021, Cox called on Hogan to end the state's coronavirus emergency declaration. In August 2021, Cox used his Facebook page to ask his constituents to e-mail the Maryland Board of Education to demand that they reject an emergency universal masking mandate regulation for the 2021–2022 academic year.

Cox claims to have survived COVID-19 twice, saying that during one of his bouts with the virus, he took hydroxychloroquine and ivermectin he obtained in Florida. Currently, ivermectin is used to treat parasites in livestock and river blindness in humans. It is of no benefit in preventing or treating COVID-19.

In January 2022, Cox attended a rally against vaccine mandates in Annapolis, Maryland. In September 2022, Cox said that he was "pro-vaccine" but does not believe in mandates.

In February 2022, Cox introduced articles of impeachment against Governor Larry Hogan for his handling of the COVID-19 pandemic. It was the first serious effort to impeach a Maryland governor in the state's history. The Maryland House Rules and Executive Nominations Committee voted unanimously to reject the articles of impeachment.

Crime and policing
In June 2022, Cox released a crime plan on Truth Social that called for allowing "modified stop and frisk" policies and enacting broken windows policing. In July, after a squeegee worker fatally shot a driver wielding a baseball bat, he posted on the conservative social media platform Gettr that he would "target an end of squeegee crimes and all crime no matter how small" and pledged to remove Marilyn Mosby as Baltimore State's Attorney. Cox has expressed interest in establishing a "prosecutorial board" to work with elected leaders in Baltimore and other crime-challenged areas to keep violent criminals in prisons. He also said he was open to using a receivership to take control of Baltimore to help combat rising crime. In an interview with DC News Now, Cox said he would provide law enforcement officers with qualified immunity protections along with increased pay.

Following the August 8, 2022 FBI search of Mar-a-Lago, Cox said on social media that he would use the Maryland State Police and Maryland National Guard to "stand against" the federal government. He also compared the FBI search to the actions of the Stasi, East Germany's secret police. At a campaign rally later that month, Cox said he opposed attacks on law enforcement officers, saying, "It's the politicians that matter. It's not the law enforcement. It's the orders from the politicians. We have to make sure we're not threatening the law enforcement officers. It's the politicians who are giving the orders. It's the politicians who have to go."

Education
As a state delegate, Cox has been a vocal critic of the Blueprint for Maryland's Future, a sweeping education reform package passed by the Maryland General Assembly in 2021. During the 2022 legislative session, Cox introduced the Maryland Parent Rights Act (HB0618), a bill that would have allowed parents a larger role in their kids' education including notifying them when curriculum changes had been made. The bill failed to pass out of committee. He also voted in favor of an amendment introduced by state Delegate Kathy Szeliga that would have blocked public schools from discussing gender and sexuality in the classroom.

During his gubernatorial campaign, Cox unveiled a "Defending Parental Rights" education platform that would ban teaching children in kindergarten through third grade about gender identity, calling it "indoctrination." When asked to elaborate his definition of "indoctrination", he cited asexual and nonbinary author Maia Kobabe's memoirs Gender Queer, which he claimed depicts "things that I cannot show you on television, it's so disgusting." Kobabe's book is not being taught in any kindergarten or elementary school classes. He's also called for a ban on critical race theory, which is not taught in Maryland public schools, and supports the expansion of school choice by increasing funding for the state's BOOST program, which provides low-income families with scholarships to attend charter schools. In September 2022, Cox said he would appoint more parents to the Maryland State Board of Education. In October 2022, Cox promised to create an office for parents' rights on his first day in office and said that he supported mandating agriculture education in schools.

Gun control
During the 2022 legislative session, Cox opposed a bill that would ban the possession and sale of ghost guns, which he compared to the 2022 Russian invasion of Ukraine. He also voted against legislation that would increase security measures at firearms stores. In June 2022, Cox celebrated the Supreme Court's ruling in New York State Rifle & Pistol Association, Inc. v. Bruen.

Healthcare
During his 2016 House of Representatives campaign, Cox said that he would move to scrap the Affordable Care Act if elected.

On Holocaust Remembrance Day in April 2021, Cox said he would vote against a bill to allow minors to consent to some health care services, comparing it to the infringement of "the rights of parents" by Nazis. Cox's Nazi analogies were criticized by the local Jewish Community Relations Council. Cox defended his remarks in a letter accusing his colleagues of twisting the words he used during an emotionally-charged floor debate to gain partisan advantage, and offered no apology for his comments.

Immigration
During his 2016 House of Representatives campaign, Cox strongly rallied on regulating immigration. He said that he would support the full enforcement of existing laws and passage of Kate's Law, which would establish mandatory minimum five-year prison sentences for any immigrant convicted of reentering the country after being deported.

Cox opposed HB892, a bill that would require a warrant in order for the U.S. Immigration and Customs Enforcement to search through the state's driver's license database.

Cox strongly opposed the Dignity Not Detention Act, which would have required people arrested for federal civil crimes to be detained in federal facilities rather than in state or local facilities. During the House debate before the bill's final vote, Cox read off a list of offenses that local law enforcement agencies would not be able to use to pass undocumented people over to ICE after they completed sentences for their crimes. The bill passed the Maryland General Assembly with a veto-proof majority, but was vetoed by Governor Hogan on May 27, 2021.

Marijuana
In 2021, Cox voted against a bill to decriminalize the possession of drug paraphernalia. In 2022, Cox voted against legislation that would create a ballot referendum to legalize recreational marijuana in Maryland, and another bill that would regulate marijuana possession should the referendum pass in November. During a debate on October 12, 2022, Cox said that he supported the release of those charged with the possession of small amounts of marijuana.

QAnon
In October 2020, Cox made a post on his Twitter account that contained hashtags related to the QAnon conspiracy theory.

In April 2022, Cox attended "Patriots Arise for God and Country" conference in Gettysburg, Pennsylvania. The event was organized by QAnon conspiracy theorists Francine and Allen Fodsick and featured images of conspiracy theories related to the September 11 attacks, the assassination of John F. Kennedy, and vaccines.

In June 2022, Cox ambushed a rally for gubernatorial candidate Kelly Schulz, where Governor Larry Hogan called him a "QAnon conspiracy theorist". In response, Cox yelled out, "Defamation, sir!" When asked to elaborate on how he had been defamed, Cox said that he was not a member of QAnon. In October 2022, when asked by WJZ-TV if believed in any of QAnon's beliefs, Cox replied, "Absolutely not. I'm disavowing all of that. This is just a lie."

Social issues
In April 2001, Cox and his wife Valerie wrote a letter to The Dorchester Star about the state's Administration Act of 2001 (SB 205), which would ban discrimination against people based on their sexual identity. In the letter, they argued that the bill would violate the rights of "business owners ... who firmly believe homosexuality is sin and those who practice it are in danger of temporal disease and eternal death."

During his 2016 House of Representatives campaign, Cox said that he did not support an increase in the minimum wage.

In August 2017, Cox served as the attorney in a lawsuit challenging the Frederick County Public School's policy on transgender students. The plaintiffs dropped the lawsuit on November 28, 2017, citing stress and potential humiliation that stemmed from the legal action. In July 2022, Cox said that he would ban transgender students from competing on girls' sports team in schools.

In September 2019, Cox introduced a bill to add "dignity of the human body" to the state's hate crime statute to cover spitting on the victim.

In March 2021, Cox voted against HB667, a bill that would abandon "Maryland, My Maryland" as Maryland's state song.

In 2022, Cox was one of 21 legislators to vote against a bill that would raise the state's minimum marriage age from 15 to 17, saying in an interview that a pregnant 16-year-old should be allowed to marry the father.

Taxes
During his gubernatorial campaign, Cox said he would immediately suspend the state's gas tax. He also said he would support providing businesses with increased tax credits, including a "dollar-for-dollar" tax credit to help employers cover the costs of paying for paid family and medical leave. Cox also supports eliminating the state income tax and would support cutting the state's corporate tax rate, personal income tax rate, and property tax rates.

Personal life
Cox has been married to his wife, Valerie, since 1996 and has ten children. The Coxes moved out of their home in Secretary, Maryland in 2004, purchasing a home for between $350,000 and $499,999 in Emmitsburg, Maryland in 2004 and keeping their Secretary home as a rental property.

Electoral history

References

External links 

 
 
 
 

1974 births
Protesters in or near the January 6 United States Capitol attack
21st-century American politicians
American conspiracy theorists
Far-right politicians in the United States
Living people
Republican Party members of the Maryland House of Delegates
Regent University School of Law alumni
University of Maryland Global Campus alumni
QAnon